Gregory Widen is an American screenwriter and film director. He is the creator of the Highlander film and television franchise, and the writer-director of the cult horror film The Prophecy.

Biography 
A native of Laguna Beach, California, Gregory Widen holds a master's degree from UCLA and once worked full-time as a city firefighter.

Filmmaking

Highlander 
While still an undergrad film student at UCLA, he sold his script for Highlander (1986). The film stars Christopher Lambert, Clancy Brown, and Sean Connery. Its tagline, "There can be only one" has gained pop culture fame. The original movie became a cult classic, spawning five sequels and Highlander: The Series, tie-in novels and video games.

Backdraft 
Widen worked as a firefighter for three years while still an undergraduate at UCLA. He witnessed a person being killed by an explosive backdraft, which became the basis for the screenplay he wrote for the movie Backdraft, directed by Ron Howard and starring Kurt Russell, William Baldwin,Scott Glenn, Donald Sutherland, Robert De Niro. Released in 1991, Backdraft received three Academy Award nominations.

Backdraft was turned into a ride for Universal Studios Hollywood (opened 1992, closed 2010) and Universal Studios Japan where it is still active.

A sequel (Backdraft 2) began production in April 2018.

The Prophecy 
In 1995, Widen wrote and directed the supernatural thriller The Prophecy starring Christopher Walken, Virginia Madsen, Eric Stoltz, and Viggo Mortensen. The film spawned four sequels: The Prophecy II (1998), The Ascent (2000), Uprising (2005) and Forsaken (2005).

Yasuke 
In 2017, original script was written by Gregory Widen for Lionsgate. Currently in Development.Lionsgate has commenced Highlander creator Gregory Widen to script Black Samurai, an action drama grounded in the historical tale of Yasuke, reputed to be the first black-skinned samurai to serve a warlord in Japan. Mike De Luca and Stephen L'Heureux are producing, and the film is a co-production between Solipsist Films and De Luca Productions.

"Yasuke (believed to have lived during the 1500s) was a samurai of black African origin who served under the Japanese warlord Oda Nobunaga in 1581 and 1582."

Television 
Widen was the creator, writer and executive producer of the series Rescue 77 and wrote for Tales from the Crypt.

Filmography 
Film

Direct-to-video

Television

Blood Makes Noise novel
In 2013 he released his debut novel, Blood Makes Noise published by Thomas & Mercer. The book received critical praise, including a starred review from Publishers Weekly and Booklist.

Awards

Backdraft 
Source:

Academy Awards, USA 1992

BAFTA Awards 1992

BMI Film & TV Awards 1992

MTV Movie + TV Awards 1992

The Prophecy
Source:

Academy of Science Fiction, Fantasy & Horror Films, USA 1996

References

External links 
 

21st-century American novelists
American film directors
American male novelists
American male screenwriters
Living people
UCLA Film School alumni
Year of birth missing (living people)
21st-century American male writers
21st-century American screenwriters